Lamberto Grimaldi (c. 1420 – March 1494) was Lord of Monaco from 16 March 1458. He was married to his cousin Claudine Grimaldi in 1465, per the wishes and legal Will and testament of her late brother, Catalan, and their father. Lamberto was of the branch of the Grimaldi family which had settled in Antibes while Claudine was of the more powerful Monaco branch. Grimaldi had one brother, Jean-André, in the church and another brother, Louis, in the military. Grimaldi found much help and support as a ruler from his brothers and, following his feud with the faction headed by Claudine's mother, Pomellina Fregoso, Lambert secured his title and an "oath of fidelity" from the population of Monaco. His marriage to Claudine ensured the continuity of Monaco's rule by a Grimaldi. Claudine was nominally her brother's successor, but all power as Seigneur of Monaco was in her husband's hands and their marriage legitimized the succession for their descendants. The succession was legally secured to the children of Lamberto and Claudine, in order of birth, on August 14, 1483. This new succession act was actually just a confirmation of the decrees drawn up by Claudine's father and brother. If only female offspring would survive, then it was decreed that such female offspring must marry a Grimaldi in order to inherit the throne.

Lamberto assumed the reins of power in Monaco at a difficult time in its often vulnerable history. Lamberto fought to preserve Monaco's independence, and is said to have "handled diplomacy and the sword with equal talent".  He also established the Grimaldi motto "With God's help." He was religious and studious, according to Bernardy, and had "studied hard" at the University of Pavia.

He and Claudine had at least six children:

Jean  (1468 – 11 October 1505)
Louis (deemed insane and barred from the inheritance)
Bianca
Augustino, Bishop of Grasse (1482 – 14 April 1532)
Françoise  (died before 1523); married Luc Doria, her son Bartholomew Doria murdered her brother Lucien
Lucien  (1487 – 22 August 1523)

References 

1420 births
1494 deaths
15th-century Lords of Monaco
15th-century French people
House of Grimaldi
Lords of Monaco
People of Ligurian descent
People with epilepsy
Royalty and nobility with disabilities